Hold Tight, It's Lena is the seventh and final album by Scottish singer Lena Zavaroni, released in 1982 by BBC Records.

Track listing 
 "Hold Tight"
 "I'll See You in My Dreams"
 "Ain't She Sweet"
 "The Very Thought of You"
 "T'aint What You Do"
 "Meet Me in St. Louis, Louis"
 "Sing, Sing, Sing" / "Christopher Columbus"
 "C.C. Rider"
 "Penny Lane"
 "You Needed Me"
 "It's a Miracle"
 "A Certain Smile"
 "Bridge Over Troubled Water"

Personnel 
 Lena Zavaroni – vocals

References

1982 albums
Lena Zavaroni albums
BBC Records albums